Diane Richardson is an American basketball coach and currently the Head Coach of Temple Owls women's basketball team. Prior to coaching at Temple, she was head coach at Towson University from 2017 to 2022, an assistant coach and recruiting coordinator at West Virginia University from 2016 to 2017, following coaching stints at George Washington University from 2012 to 2016, the University of Maryland from 2007 to 2008, and American University from 2006 to 2007.

Early life
Diane Richardson obtained her bachelor's degree in psychology and sociology from Frostburg State University where she participated in basketball and track and was a 1979 NCAA champion in both 200- and 400 meter races. In 1980 she earned a spot at the 1980 Summer Olympics but didn't participate. Four years later, she got her master's degree in management from Central Michigan University. She also was a founder of American Security Companies and Vice President of Bank of America's lending marketing team.

Coaching career

Riverdale Baptist High School
From 2001 to 2006 she coached at Riverdale Baptist High in Upper Marlboro, Maryland, during which time her team won five championships.

American University
Following her success at Riverdale Baptist, she was hired as an assistant coach at American University.

Maryland
Richardson was hired as an assistant at Maryland in 2007 replacing Joanna Bernabei.

Return to Riverdale Baptist
Richardson returned to Riverdale Baptist as head coach in 2009 until 2012.

George Washington
In 2012, she was hired as an assistant coach at George Washington who went from 11 wins to 29 in just four years due to her coaching and made the NCAA Tournament in 2015 and 2016.

West Virginia
In 2016, Richardson was hired as an assistant coach at West Virginia Mountaineers.

Towson
In 2017 she was named the Head Coach of Towson Tigers women's basketball team. Her 2018-19 season began with hiring of six new recruits. In the 2018-19 season, Richardson coached the Tigers to the first-ever CAA Championship title and the program's first appearance in the NCAA Tournament. She was named CAA and ECAC Coach of the Year.

Temple
Diane Richardson was named the 21st head women's basketball coach of Temple University on April 5, 2022. On April 20, 2022, Richardson and Temple announced that 5 members of her coaching staff at Towson, including associate head coach Zach Kancher would be joining her staff at Temple.

Personal life
Richardson is married and has four children.

References

20th-century births
Living people
American women's basketball coaches
Central Michigan University alumni
Frostburg State University alumni
American University
George Washington Colonials women's basketball coaches
Maryland Terrapins women's basketball coaches
Towson Tigers women's basketball coaches
West Virginia Mountaineers women's basketball coaches
Year of birth missing (living people)
Temple Owls women's basketball coaches